Nigel Francis (born 6 September 1971) is a Trinidadian cricketer. He played in 29 first-class and 12 List A matches for Trinidad and Tobago from 1992 to 1998.

See also
 List of Trinidadian representative cricketers

References

External links
 

1971 births
Living people
Trinidad and Tobago cricketers
Marylebone Cricket Club cricketers